Bulbophyllum elegans is a species of orchid in the genus Bulbophyllum.

See also 
 List of Bulbophyllum species

References 

 The Bulbophyllum-Checklist
 The Internet Orchid Species Photo Encyclopedia

External links 
 
 

elegans
Plants described in 1864